The Lucchese crime family's New Jersey faction, also known as the Jersey Crew, is a powerful crew within the Lucchese crime family. The members operate throughout the Northern New Jersey area. During the 1970s into the late 1980s, the crew was led by Anthony Accetturo and his protégé Michael Taccetta. In 1987, Victor Amuso took over the family and began demanding a higher percentage of tribute from the crew. Accetturo refused and a war erupted between the New Jersey members and the New York members. This left brothers Michael and Martin Taccetta in charge of the crew as they tried to have Accetturo and his family murdered. In 1993, Accetturo defected and became a government witness. He helped convict Michael and Martin Taccetta. The crew was most recently controlled by Ralph Perna.

History

Early history
The early members of the New Jersey crew worked as bootlegging under Gaetano Reina's crime family. Throughout the prohibition era the crew smuggled alcohol into New York City. In 1930, Reina was murdered and his family was taken over by Tommy Gagliano.

During the 1940s and early 1950s, the crew was headed by Settimo Accardi in Newark. In 1953, Accardi's U.S. citizenship was revoked after not disclosing his previous arrest record. Accardi was arrested in 1955 on narcotic charges and fled the country. With Accardi's absence Anthony Delasco and Joseph Abate took over running the New Jersey the crew.

Accetturo in charge
Toward the 1970s, the crew was unofficially headed by Anthony "Tumac" Accetturo, because Accetturo had not yet been inducted into the Lucchese crime family due to "closed books". The leader of the crew was still Joseph Abate, with Anthony Accetturo as his protégé waiting to take over. The crew then came to control the entire Newark area, with loansharking, illegal gambling, narcotics, money laundering and extortion operations. Reportedly, with Accetturo in charge of the crew, they handed something between $70,000 and $80,000 a year to Tommy Lucchese. Upon Lucchese's death in 1967, and several years of different "acting bosses" such as Carmine "Mr. Gribbs" Tramunti and Ettore "Eddie" Coco. At the end of 1973, when Anthony Corallo was released from prison, he was quickly installed as boss. Corallo, a longtime friend of Accetturo, quickly inducted Accetturo and his second in commands Michael "Mad Dog" Taccetta and Martin Taccetta into the Lucchese crime family, so they could officially control the entire New Jersey area.

Accetturo and Taccetta
During the early 1970s, Accetturo relocated to Miami to avoid prosecution for his illegal gambling and loansharking business in Newark, and Michael Taccetta was soon promoted by Accetturo to run the day-to-day activities. Meanwhile, Accetturo created illegal operations in Florida where he could lie low from law enforcement. Taccetta soon expanded Accetturo's former operations in New Jersey as the crew grew stronger, and several members of the Lucchese crime family in New York were sent to win over the moneymakers. Taccetta developed an operation that soon controlled the entire New Jersey area. From arson and burglary, to loansharking and extortion, to illegal gambling and drug trafficking, the Jersey Crew soon made millions of dollars in profit, and sent hundreds of thousands of dollars back to Anthony Corallo in New York City for years. Both Accetturo and Taccetta soon became the most powerful mobsters in New Jersey. Accetturo was repeatedly indicted, and the State of New Jersey tried to extradite him but failed due to his "poor" health. Accetturo later relocated his business interests to Miami and Hollywood, Florida, but still remained the official boss of New Jersey. Michael Taccetta was chosen once again to run the Northern New Jersey crew of the Lucchese crime family, during the mid-1970s. Toward the late 1970s, the crew allegedly earned something between $700,000 and $800,000 in profit every year.

Operating in Philadelphia
In 1980, the longtime Don of the Philadelphia crime family, Angelo "Gentle Don" Bruno, was shot and killed on March 12. This resulted in a huge power vacuum between prominent Bruno members Philip Testa and Nicodemo Scarfo, both fighting for the total control of the Bruno crime family. Accetturo and Taccetta, on the other hand, used their situation to establish a new foothold in Philadelphia, as a part of the Jersey Crew, with illegal gambling and loansharking operations. Because of the bad relations between the two factions in Philadelphia's crime family, as well as both Taccetta and Accetturo taking advantage of the situation, the relationship between Philadelphia and the New York Families, especially the Luccheses, eventually turned worse after the murder of Angelo Bruno, which led to all cooperation between the families being completely terminated. It was around this time that prominent Bruno member Giacomo "Jackie" DiNorscio, and many others, defected to the New Jersey faction of the Lucchese crime family to make more profit and to avoid being killed.

21 months in trial
During the early 1980s, US law enforcement started an operation to terminate all organized crime activities in the North Jersey area. After a four-year-long investigation was finished, indictments were brought against 20 members of the Jersey Crew. Accetturo was brought from Florida, the Taccetta brothers were arrested in Newark, and 17 other known members were put on trial for 76 Racketeer Influenced and Corrupt Organizations Act (RICO) predicates, which included loansharking, extortion, racketeering, illegal gambling, money laundering, drug trafficking, arson and thefts, as well as murder and conspiracy to commit murder. The trial began in late 1986-early 1987. During the trial, former member of the Philadelphia crime family Giacomo "Jackie" DiNorscio fired his lawyer and went on to represent himself during the entire trial. Although not popular with Accetturo and Taccetta, DiNorscio is reported to have charmed the jury. On August 26, 1988, all 20 defendants were acquitted in the 21-month trial. The prosecutors were stunned, and the Jersey Crew went right back to where they had left off.

The Taccetta era
Even with the acquittals, the authorities eventually managed to split up the Jersey Crew when Michael Taccetta grew jealous of Anthony Accetturo, Jr., who was supposed to take over for Anthony Accetturo upon his retirement. The Taccetta brothers reportedly declared war on Accetturo, who had escaped to Miami to avoid being killed. Although the war never got to a point of massive shooting in the streets, the two factions were close to killing and destroying each other completely in late 1988. The crew had other problems, however, when the Lucchese crime family was given new leadership under Vittorio "Vic" Amuso, who stepped up after Corallo.

New York rivalry
Toward the year of 1989, the Jersey Crew's war had diminished because the two factions were more interested in making money than in arguing about who was in charge. The new leaders were reportedly Michael Taccetta and Martin Taccetta, who operated through their legitimate business, Taccetta Group Enterprises, which was under control by the Lucchese crime family. Through the company, the Jersey Crew were able to launder money and pay their tribute to the heads of the Luccheses in New York. However, both Accetturo and Taccetta had apparently skimmed off some profit and only sent a $50,000-a-year payment to the new leaders from the Brooklyn faction. When Anthony Corallo was sentenced to life imprisonment in 1987, and his protégé Anthony "Buddy" Luongo was found murdered earlier, the new bosses Victor Amuso and Anthony "Gaspipe" Casso, known for their brutal use of violence, questioned the profit they received from the Jersey Crew. When they demanded 50% of the crew's total profit, both Taccetta and Accetturo reportedly refused, portraying themselves as hard-working money machines that were only having a bad year. Amuso and Casso, on the other hand, saw this as an act of weakness, and gave the order to "Whack Jersey", meaning that the entire North Jersey faction should be eliminated. Summoned to a meeting in Brooklyn with Victor Amuso and Anthony Casso, the entire North Jersey faction, who were fearful of being massacred, went into hiding, disrupting their illegal activities. Over the next 12 months, most of the New Jersey crew members came back to the family. Amuso is to have portrayed Accetturo as a distrustful servant who was betraying his boss. Taccetta reportedly sent messages to Amuso in Brooklyn asking that a contract to be placed on Accetturo's life, so Taccetta could control the entire New Jersey faction.

Taccetta's arrest and trial
In the early 1990s, with the murder contract on his life, Accetturo was placed under federal protection after being extradited from North Carolina to New Jersey. During this time, Accetturo had little power over the New Jersey faction he had been reportedly stripped of his rank and demoted to soldier. The Taccetta brothers also had problems with their longtime rival Thomas Ricciardi who was trying to take over the faction. In 1992 the entire crew's administration Anthony Accetturo, Michael and Martin Taccetta, Thomas Ricciardi and Michael Perna were indicted on racketeering, loansharking, extortion, illegal gambling, drug trafficking, murder and conspiracy to commit murder. In 1993, when the trial began both Accetturo and Ricciardi decided to defect to the government and turn state's evidence testifying against Michael and Martin Taccetta, and Michael Perna.

On August 13, 1993, the jury convicted all three men of racketeering and Martin Taccetta was sentenced to life in prison. Michael Taccetta and Michael Perna later pleaded guilty and were sentenced on September 20, 1993, to 25 years in prison each.

In 2005, Martin Taccetta won an appeal and regained his freedom, but in July 2009 the New Jersey Supreme Court reversed the lower court decision and upheld his life sentence for racketeering and extortion. Ricciardi went into the Witness Protection Program, and revealed that the Racketeer Influenced and Corrupt Organizations Act (RICO) case in 1988 ended the way it did because the jury had been rigged.

Operation Heat

On December 18, 2007, thirty two members and associates of the Lucchese crime family's New Jersey faction were arrested on gambling, money laundering and racketeering charges. The arrests resulted from the investigation "Operation Heat" and alleged that the New Jersey faction ran an illegal gambling operation that earned approximately $2.2 billion over a 15-month period. It also revealed that members of the Lucchese family's New Jersey faction had an alliance with a New Jersey corrections officer and members of the Nine Trey Gangster's (a set of the Bloods) to smuggle drugs and pre-paid cell phones into East Jersey State Prison in Woodbridge. Those arrested were: New York capo's Joseph DiNapoli and Matthew Madonna, New Jersey capo Ralph V. Perna, his three son's Joseph M. Perna, John G. Perna and Ralph M. Perna, Martin Taccetta, Michael A. Cetta (deceased 2013), John V. "Blackie" Mangrella, Alfonso "Tic" Cataldo (deceased 2013), Antonio "Curly" Russo, Elliot Porco, Gianni "John" Iacovo, James Furfaro Jr., John N. Turi, Anthony "Tony" Patrizzio, Michael T. Ramuno III, Robert A. Romano, Ron Scripps; the prison smuggling scheme involved Michael T. "Mac" Bruinton (former corrections officer), Edwin B. "Money" Spears, Dwayne E. Spears, Samuel A. Juliano (deceased 2012), Francine Hightower, and Kristen A. Gilliam; summonses were issued for: Blerim Ibraimi, George Maiorano, Vita Cetta (widow of Michael Cetta), Roseanna Perna (wife of Joseph Perna), Wayne Cross Jr. and David Ocejo.

On May 14, 2010, thirty four members and associates of the Lucchese crime family's New Jersey faction were indicted on gambling, money laundering and racketeering charges. From the original thirty two arrested in 2007, Wayne Cross Jr., David Ocejo and Astrit Hani were excluded from the indictment. The indictment did name Nicodemo Scarfo, Jr., Frank Cetta, Gary P. Medure, Michael A. Maffucci, Robert V. DeCrescenzo and Charles J. Bologna as new defendants in the case. According to the indictment Ralph Perna "allegedly became top capo of the New Jersey faction of the family when Nicky Scarfo Jr. was demoted in 2007". The indictment also stated that defendant Francine Hightower had pleaded guilty in February 2008, to conspiring to launder money in part of the prison smuggling scheme.

In May 2011, Gianni Iacovo pleaded guilty to promoting gambling. He was placed on probation and will serve no prison time. In October 2011, Michael A. Maffucci pleaded guilty to promoting gambling and could be sentenced to three to five years in state prison.

As of November 2013, three defendants in the case have died of natural causes: Alfonso T. Cataldo (died August 21, 2013), Michael A. Cetta (died June 2013) and Samuel A. Juliano (died March 2012).

In May 2015  Robert DeCrescenzo and Charles Bologna pleaded guilty to money laundrying and were sentenced to two years probation. Both were arrested in 2007. Case lasted 8 years.

On September 30, 2015, Matthew Madonna was sentenced to five years in state prison and Martin Taccetta was sentenced to eight years in prison after pleading guilty to racketeering in Operation Heat.

On October 29, 2015, John Mangrella was sentenced to eight years in state prison on a guilty plea to first-degree racketeering in Operation Heat.

On January 7, 2016, Ralph V. Perna received an eight-year sentence and his two sons Joseph Perna and John Perna each received 10 year sentences after pleading guilty to running a multibillion-dollar gambling enterprise. Also in January 2016, charges were dismissed against two wives Rosanna Perna, who is Joseph Perna's wife and Vita Cetta, whose husband Michael Cetta died in 2013. It was also revealed another defendant has died, Gianni Iacovo.

In February 2016, Joseph DiNapoli pleaded guilty and was sentenced to three years in prison.

Current position
In 2004, the New Jersey Commission of Investigation stated that the Lucchese crime family had about 50 members active in New Jersey. The New Jersey faction is currently led by capo Ralph Perna, who took over in 2007.

In May 2008, Martin Taccetta was indicted along with Gambino crime family capo Andrew Merola on racketeering, gambling and labor corruption. In December 2009, Taccetta was summoned to a Newark courtroom.

On March 9, 2013, Lucchese family associate Gianni Iacovo was charged with seven counts of burglary and was held on $70,000 bond at the Bergen County Jail.

On January 26, 2014, Carlo Taccetta, the son of Michael Taccetta was arrested with 65 pounds of marijuana and was charged with possession and possession with intent to distribute marijuana.

Historical leadership

Caporegimes
c. 1920s–1955 – Settimo "Big Sam" Accardi – fled the country in 1955
1955–1960s – Anthony "Ham" Delasco – died
c. 1960s–1979 – Joseph Abate – retired, died in 1994 
Acting c. 1972-1979 – Anthony Accetturo – promoted to caporegime
1979–1988 – Anthony "Tumac" Accetturo – demoted, imprisoned in 1993 and became a government witness 
Acting c. 1980–1988 – Michael "Mad Dog" Taccetta – served as "underboss" to Accetturo, while his brother Martin Taccetta served as the "consigliere" for the New Jersey faction, and his cousin Michael Perna served as an adviser in the faction.
1988–1993 – Michael "Mad Dog" Taccetta – in 1993 sentenced to life in prison 
c. 1993–2003 – Robert "Bucky the Boss" Caravaggio
2003–2005 – John "Johnny Hooks" Capra
Acting 2003–2005 – Nicodemo "Nicky" Scarfo, Jr. – promoted to caporegime
2005–2007 – Nicodemo "Nicky" Scarfo, Jr. – demoted 
2007–2010 – Ralph V. "Ralphie" Perna – arrested 2007 indicted 2010, sentenced 2016 
2010–2020 – Richard "Richie the Claw" DeLuca – died September 19, 2020
Acting 2015 – Michael Perna – died October 28, 2020
Acting 2015–2020 – Joseph R. "Big Joe" Perna 
2020–present – George "Georgie Neck" Zappola 
Acting 2020–present – Joseph R. "Big Joe" Perna

In popular culture
The 2006, Sidney Lumet film Find Me Guilty chronicles the 2-year trial of Accetturo, the Taccetta brothers and the other family members. Vin Diesel stars as Giacomo "Jackie" DiNorscio who defends himself.
According to the Crime Library website, the Jersey Crew is the main inspiration of the DiMeo crime family in the HBO TV-show The Sopranos. Michael Taccetta is probably the inspiration to the leading role of Tony Soprano, as other real-life Jersey crew members can be recognized on the screen.

Notes

References

DeVico, Peter J. The Mafia Made Easy: The Anatomy and Culture of La Cosa Nostra. Tate Publishing, 2007. .
Rudolph, Robert C. The Boys from New Jersey: How the Mob Beat the Feds. New York: William Morrow and Company Inc., 1992. 
Carlo, Philip. Gaspipe: Confessions of a Mafia Boss. William Morrow (2008)  

 

 
Organizations established in the 1920s
1920s establishments in New Jersey
Organizations based in Newark, New Jersey
New Jersey faction
American Mafia crews
Gangs in New Jersey
Italian-American culture in New Jersey